Memerambi is a rural town and locality in the South Burnett Region, Queensland, Australia.

Geography

History
The name Memerambi is an Aboriginal word for the sugargum tree.

On 17 October 1904, the first government land sales occurred in the new town of Memerambi with 58 town lots and 74 suburban lots on offer.

Memerambi was once a bustling centre with a hotel, two general stores, saddlery, butcher, bank, mobile sawmill and cheese factory.

Memerambi Post Office opened by September 1910 (a receiving office had been open from 1909) and closed in 1978.

Memerambi Provisional School opened on 16 October 1905. On 1 January 1909, it became Memerambi State School. The school celebrated its centenary on 15 October 2005. It was mothballed on 31 December 2006 and closed on 23 October 2007. The school was at 1-27 King Street. The school's website was archived.

Memerambi Methodist Church was built in 1908 at a cost of £100. It could seat 100 people. It was on the corner of Corndale Road and Earl Street. In 1956, it was relocated to Corndale.

All Saints' Anglican Church was dedicated on 9 April 1912. It closed circa 1966.

Education 
There are no schools in Memerambi. The nearest government primary schools are Wooroolin State School in neighbouring Wooroolin to the north and Crawford State School in neighbouring Crawford to the south. The nearest government secondary school is Kingaroy State High School in Kingaroy to the south.

Facilities 
Today businesses in Memerambi include 'Stop Shop' general store;  clock repairs; large machinery & engineering works; pharmaceutical manufacturing; stock feed store; graziers; concreting & pool construction.

Notable residents
Mr Kingston and his wife with their four children. Mr and Mrs Kingston were the first storekeepers in Memerambi
Arthur Benjamin Postle, a professional sprinter known as "The Crimson Flash",  was acclaimed "the fastest man in the world" in 1906. He moved to Memerambi in 1913 and operated his own auctioning business there.
Ben and Harry Young, of Memerambi, pioneers of the South Burnett peanut industry, planted the first commercial crop of peanuts in the South Burnett in 1919. These brothers were sons of a Chinese immigrant, Ah Young. Harry Young later designed the first peanut thresher in Queensland and Ben became a director of the Peanut Marketing Board.

See also

 Kingaroy Peanut Silos

References

External links 

 

Towns in Queensland
South Burnett Region
Localities in Queensland